The 90 class are a class of heavy haul diesel-electric locomotives built by Electro-Motive Division, Canada for FreightCorp and EDi Rail, Cardiff for Pacific National for use on high tonnage Hunter Valley coal workings.

History
Ordered in July 1992 under the Clyde ReadyPower contract along with the 82 class, the first batch of 31 locomotives were built by Electro-Motive Division in London, Ontario, Canada in 1994. The second batch of four locomotives were delivered in November 2005, assembled by EDi Rail at Cardiff Workshops to the same specification from components imported from Canada and frames built in Port Augusta South Australia.

The 90 class were designed specifically for heavy coal haulage in the Lower Hunter Valley region of New South Wales, to meet the required specifications the class was designed with much heavier frames than typical for locomotives then in use specifically to increase their tractive effort. This made them the heaviest locomotives in use in Australia outside the Pilbara region until delivery of the QR National 5020 class in 2010. This has restricted the class to the Hunter Valley coal network for their entire career with minimal exception. 

The locomotives were designed with many component commonalities with the 82 Class for ease of maintenance at the Clyde Engineering Kooragang Island servicing facility, a purpose built maintenance depot for the 90 and 82 class locomotives constructed as part of the Clyde ReadyPower contact, opening in June 1994.

A number of the class were named after Australian Olympic Games athletes. 

All passed to Pacific National when FreightCorp was privatised in February 2002.

The majority of the Canadian built locomotives retain their FreightCorp livery with Pacific National decals, while the later EDi batch were all delivered in Pacific National livery. Slowly, Canadian built locomotives are being repainted into the Pacific National Livery, with 9012 being the first repainted in November 2018.

Units 9032, 9033 and 9034 were modified by EDi Rail in May of 2017 to increase their mass to 177 tons, bringing their tractive effort on par with more modern AC units.

Many of the design features of the class were incorporated into the Downer EDI Rail GT46C.

Operations
Usually restricted to Hunter Valley coal trains, the 90 class operate these services from various Newcastle coal export terminals and the Eraring Power Station as far a field as Muswellbrook and Ulan, usually double or triple heading trains of up to 96 coal wagons. Until recently this was the only revenue work the locomotives had performed, this changing in 2020 with Pacific National now allocating three locomotives at a time for banking duties over the Liverpool Ranges at Ardglen. This being achieved after gradual axle-loading upgrades of the Main North Line past Muswellbrook to support the boom of coal output from the Gunnedah Basin, and an upgrade of Progress Rail's yard infrastructure in Werris Creek, where the locomotives are serviced whilst allocated to banking. Members of the class have also visited the wheel lathe at Delec Locomotive Depot in Sydney and one was on display at Sydney Central for the 100th Anniversary of Clyde Engineering in 1998. To minimise weight, they operated as light engine and with only a small amount of fuel.

Future
With ARTC's intention for all Hunter Valley coal trains to operate using Electronically controlled pneumatic brakes (ECP) in the near future, a technology the 90 class do not possess. Along with the continued obsolescence of the class's DC traction package when compared to more modern AC locomotives the class are approaching the final years of their niche in heavy coal haulage outside of undergoing a major rebuild. What will happen is unclear as Pacific National have made conflicting statements and actions regrading whether the locomotives will be rebuilt or withdrawn from service in the near future, with members of the class coming in and out of storage, although none at this time have been scrapped. Their heavy weight still restricts their field of operation greatly, so once retired from coal work the locomotives will struggle to fit other work outside the before-mentioned banking duties.

Status table

Related development
 Downer EDI Rail GT46C

References

External links

Co-Co locomotives
Electro-Motive Diesel locomotives
Diesel locomotives of New South Wales
Pacific National diesel locomotives
Railway locomotives introduced in 1994
Standard gauge locomotives of Australia
Diesel-electric locomotives of Australia